Anoplonida cracentis is a species of squat lobster in the family Munididae. The species name is derived from the Latin cracentis, meaning slender or graceful, in reference to its slender chelipeds.

References

Squat lobsters
Crustaceans described in 1996